D'Navigators Iloilo are a men's volleyball team based in Iloilo City. They compete in the Spikers' Turf.

History
Iloilo City-based D' Navigators Iloilo entered the Spikers' Turf, debuting at the 2023 Open Conference. Prior to their participating they won the 2023 Dinagyang Volleyball League.

References

Sports in Iloilo
Men's volleyball teams in the Philippines